The member states of the African Union are the 55 sovereign states that have ratified or acceded to the Constitutive Act of the African Union to become member states to the African Union (AU). The AU was the successor to the Organisation of African Unity (OAU), and AU membership was open to all OAU member states.

From an original membership of 36 states when the OAU was established on 25 May 1963, there have been nineteen successive enlargements—the largest occurring on 18 July 1975 when four states joined.  Morocco is the newest member state, having joined on 31 January 2017. Morocco was a founding member of the OAU but withdrew in 1984 following the organization's acceptance of the Sahrawi Arab Democratic Republic as a member state. Morocco rules over most of the territory, but sovereignty is disputed.

As of 2017, the AU spans the entirety of the African continent, with the exception of the Spanish North Africa semi-enclaves of Ceuta, Melilla, and Vélez de la Gomera. Island states are also members of the AU, but not the offshore islands that are integral parts of the transcontinental countries of France, Italy, Portugal, Spain and Yemen. The 55 member states are grouped into five regions, with the African diaspora, structured as the State of the African Diaspora, known as the 6th Region.

The African Union is composed of fifty-two republics and three monarchies. The total population of the AU is 1,068,444,000 (2013).

Current members

Former members

Accession

South Africa joined on 6 June 1994 after the end of the apartheid and the April 1994 general election.

South Sudan, which seceded from Sudan on 9 July 2011, joined the AU on 27 July 2011.

The AU's most recent member state is Morocco, having joined on 31 January 2017. Morocco withdrew from the OAU in 1984 following the organization's acceptance of the Sahrawi Arab Democratic Republic as a member state. Morocco rules over most of the territory, but sovereignty is disputed.

See also
List of African Union member states by political system

References

 
Member States
African Union